Mykhailo Fedorovych Shpir (born August 16, 1986, Chernivtsi, Ukrainian SSR, USSR) is a Ukrainian opposition journalist, blogger, political scientist. Since September 22, 2022 Deputy Minister of Digital Development and Mass Communications of the Kherson Oblast.

Biography 
In 2008 he graduated from the law faculty of the Vasyl Stefanyk Precarpathian National University. In 2014 he graduated from the aspirantur at Kyiv National Economic University, the topic of the thesis is "brand portfolio management at the enterprise". Since 2009, he worked as editor of the Russian edition of "" and the ukrainian magazine "Zolotaya kasta". In May 17, 2010 he founded the "Sistema" management company, which provided branding, promotion, design and advertising services. In the 2019 Ukrainian parliamentary election, he ran for People's Deputies on the list of the "Opposition Platform — For Life". Since spring 2021 he has been working in Moscow.

Prosecution 
In 2017 added to the site Myrotvorets for incitement to ethnic hatred.

He claimed that he received threats from right-wing radicals, and that a group of ukrainian nationalists attacked him in a Kyiv restaurant, doused him with coffee and smashed his glasses. On August 25, 2020, he provoked a fight in Lviv.

In September 6, 2020 he fled Ukraine to seek political asylum. The Security Service of Ukraine put him on the wanted list on charges of violating several articles of the Criminal Code of Ukraine. On March 18, 2021, security officers searched his places of residence in Ukraine.

On March 18, 2021, security officers searched his apartment in Kiev, his parents' house in Ivano-Frankivsk and the place of residence of his girlfriend. They seized equipment, money and everything that looked like communist symbols.

References

External links 
 SBU conducts searches at the defendant in the base of the "Myrotvorets" 
 SBU reports suspicion of separatism to political expert Mikhail Shpir (video) 
 Rampant neo-Nazism: Ukraine demolishes monuments to the heroes of the Second World War and glorifies fascism 
 

Ukrainian bloggers
Ukrainian journalists
21st-century journalists
1986 births
Living people